Athi river may refer to:

 Athi-Galana-Sabaki River
 Athi River (town)
 Athi River Super Bridge